The MV Quinault was a  operated by Washington State Ferries.

Originally built as the MV Redwood Empire in Oakland for Northwestern Pacific, she started out serving Southern Pacific Railways on their Golden Gate Ferries line on San Francisco Bay.  She was purchased by the Puget Sound Navigation Company (PSN) in 1940, brought to Puget Sound and renamed the MV Quinault, serving PSN until Washington State Ferries acquired and took over operations in 1951.  In 2002, Quinault was featured in a scene in the movie The Ring.

On November 20, 2007, the entire Steel Electric class was withdrawn from service due to hull corrosion issues. The Quinault was not in service at the time.

On June 19, 2009, Washington State Ferries sold the Quinault and the other Steel Electrics for $200,000.00  to Eco Planet Recycling, Inc. of Chula Vista, California.  In August 2009 the ferry was towed out of Eagle Harbor to Ensenada, Mexico and was cut up for scrap.

References

Washington State Ferries vessels
Puget Sound Navigation Company
1927 ships
Ships built in Oakland, California